Băshovia is a compilation album by composer and guitarist Robbie Basho, released on August 14, 2001 by Takoma Records. The tracks comprising the album were remastered by Joe Tarantino at Fantasy Studios in Berkeley.

Track listing

Personnel
Adapted from the Băshovia liner notes.
 Robbie Basho – acoustic guitar, acoustic twelve-string guitar, vocals
 Bill Belmont – production
 Paul Kagan – photography
 Linda Kalin – design
 Joe Tarantino – remastering

Release history

References

External links 
 

2001 compilation albums
Robbie Basho albums
Takoma Records compilation albums